Emilson Rakotonarivo (born 24 October 1972) is a retired Malagasy football defender.

References

1972 births
Living people
Malagasy footballers
Madagascar international footballers
Ecoredipharm players
Association football defenders